The 2021–22 Vegas Golden Knights season was the fifth season for the National Hockey League franchise that started playing in the 2017–18 season. Despite high expectations entering the season, the Golden Knights missed the playoffs for the first time in franchise history, as they were eliminated from playoff contention following a 4–3 shootout loss to the Chicago Blackhawks on April 27, 2022.

Standings

Divisional standings

Conference standings

Schedule and results

Regular season
The regular season schedule was published on July 22, 2021. Due to COVID-19-related postponements and the NHL's withdrawal from Olympic participation, substantial updates to the schedule were published on January 19, 2022.

Player statistics
Updated to games played April 29, 2022

Skaters

Goaltenders

†Denotes player spent time with another team before joining the Golden Knights. Stats reflect time with the Golden Knights only.
‡Denotes player was traded or waived mid-season. Stats reflect time with the Golden Knights only.
Bold/italics denotes franchise record.

Transactions
The Golden Knights have been involved in the following transactions during the 2021–22 season.

Trades

Voided trade

On March 21, 2022, the date of the NHL's trade deadline, the Golden Knights attempted to trade forward Evgenii Dadonov and a 2nd-round pick to the Anaheim Ducks in exchange for defenseman John Moore and the contract of retired forward Ryan Kesler. However, the trade was voided by the NHL on March 23, as Dadonov's limited no-trade clause had not been complied with.

Players acquired

Players lost

Signings

Draft picks

Below are the Vegas Golden Knights' selections at the 2021 NHL Entry Draft, which were held on July 23 to 24, 2021. It was held virtually via Video conference call from the NHL Network studio in Secaucus, New Jersey.

Notes

References

Vegas Golden Knights seasons
Vegas Golden Knights
Golden Knights
Golden Knights